Philipp Müller (born 5 November 1952, in Mogelsberg, St. Gallen) is a Swiss politician and was the leader of FDP.The Liberals from 2012 until 16 April 2016. He served in the National Council from 2003 to 2015, before being elected to the Council of States in 2016, representing Aargau.

References

1952 births
Living people
FDP.The Liberals politicians